In for Thirty Days is a 1919 American silent comedy film, directed by Webster Cullison. It stars May Allison, Robert Ellis, and Mayme Kelso, and was released on January 27, 1919.

Cast list
 May Allison as Helen Corning
 Robert Ellis as Brett Page
 Mayme Kelso as Mrs. Corning
 Rex Cherryman as Count Dronsky
 Jay Dwiggens as Judge Carroll
 George Berrell as Homer Brown
 Bull Montana as Hot Stove Kelly

References

External links 
 
 
 

1919 comedy films
1919 films
Silent American comedy films
American silent feature films
American black-and-white films
Metro Pictures films
1910s English-language films
1910s American films